Great Construction Projects of Communism is a phrase that used to identify a series of the most ambitious construction projects and had great importance for the economy of the Soviet Union. The projects were initiated in 1950s on the command of Joseph Stalin.

A 1952 book Hydrography of the USSR lists the following projects in irrigation, navigation,  and hydroelectric power. 
Kuybyshev Hydroelectric Station, now Zhiguli Hydroelectric Station in Samara Oblast, Russia
Stalingrad Hydroelectric Station, now Volga Hydroelectric Station near Volgograd, and the associated irrigation network in the Caspian Depression
 Tsimlyansk Hydroelectric Station, now in Rostov Oblast, Russia
The system of Kakhovka Hydroelectric Power Plant in the lower part of the Dnieper river, North Crimean Canal, South Ukraine Canal, and irrigation networks in northern Crimea and southern Ukraine
Main Turkmen Canal, unfinished
The Volga–Don Canal
The White Sea–Baltic Canal
The Moscow Canal

See also
Northern river reversal, another ambitious Soviet project
Great Plan for the Transformation of Nature
Shock construction projects
Ten Great Buildings in 1950s Beijing

References

Soviet phraseology
Economic history of the Soviet Union
1950s in the Soviet Union